The 1961 European Amateur Boxing Championships  were held in Belgrade, Yugoslavia from 3 to 10 June. The 14th edition of the bi-annual competition was organised by the European governing body for amateur boxing, EABA. There were 146 fighters from 21 countries participating.

Medal winners

Medal table

External links
Results
Amateur Boxing

European Amateur Boxing Championships
Boxing
European Amateur Boxing Championships
Boxing
International sports competitions in Belgrade
European Amateur Boxing Championships
1960s in Belgrade
European Amateur Boxing Championships